Pultenaea daltonii, commonly known as hoary bush-pea, is a species of flowering plant in the family Fabaceae and is endemic to western Victoria, Australia. It is a spreading shrub with cylindrical leaves, grooved on the upper surface, and clusters of yellow flowers with red markings.

Description
The flowers are arranged in leaf axils in clusters of eight to sixteen.

Taxonomy and naming
Pultenaea daltonii was first formally described in 1922 by Herbert Bennett Williamson in the Proceedings of the Royal Society of Victoria from specimens collected by St. Eloy D'Alton between Nhill and Goroke in 1897. The specific epithet (daltonii) honours the collector of the type specimens.

Distribution and habitat
This pultenaea usually grows in dry rainforest and occurs in scattered locations in western and south-western Victoria.

References

daltonii
Flora of Victoria (Australia)
Plants described in 1922